Tammenga is a resort in Suriname, located in the Paramaribo District.  Its population at the 2012 census was 15,819. The resort has been named after Henderijkes Tammenga (1815-1864), who after his first plantation did not succeed, started farming in a swampy area near Paramaribo in 1852. Most of the area was sold to East Indian indentured workers in the late 19th century.

Notable people
 Bernardo Ashetu (1929-1982), writer.

References

Resorts of Suriname
Populated places in Paramaribo District